State Road 85 (SR 85) is a north–south state highway that runs from US 98 in Fort Walton Beach, Florida north to State Route 55 at the Florida/Alabama state line. In its earliest inception, it was just a clayed road over graded sandy soil, and was known early in the twentieth century as the Georgia, Alabama and Florida Highway.

Route description
From its southern terminus at the intersection of US 98 in downtown Fort Walton Beach to Shalimar, Florida, SR 85 is a six-lane highway with turn medians, accessing local beaches and Eglin Air Force Base.  The road, known as Eglin Parkway, runs north through Fort Walton Beach, and the town of Cinco Bayou before crossing the namesake Cinco Bayou Bridge, and then through the Ocean City area of Fort Walton Beach. It crosses Garniers Bayou into Shalimar, and thence north onto the Eglin reservation where it becomes a four-lane route with grass median. It then skirts the northwest side of Eglin Air Force Base Main Base, with a grade separated interchange for State Road 123 and Northwest Florida Regional Airport, continuing as a four-lane divided highway with a  speed limit. A former railroad grade crossing just south of the commercial terminal was removed when the south end of the Eglin Base Railroad was abandoned in the 1980s. Looping through Valparaiso as Government Avenue and the John Sims Parkway into Niceville, SR 85 turns north at the intersection with State Road 20, passing College Boulevard, another removed Eglin AFB railroad grade crossing, and the intersection with State Road 293 Mid-Bay Bridge Connector. Continuing north, there is an interchange with the northern terminus of State Road 123.  SR 85 continues north through a grade-separated intersection at 77th Special Forces Way, serving the cantonment for the 7th Special Forces Group and Duke Field.  The road continues north, reaching the Crestview city limits. There, commercialization begins to develop and it becomes a divided highway at the interchange with I-10 at exit 56. The road continues through Crestview, the Okaloosa County seat, intersecting U.S. Route 90, the Old Spanish Trail, and continues north towards Alabama.  North of the community of Auburn to the Alabama line State Road 85 is a two-lane rural highway. Just south of Laurel Hill, the road crosses on a bridge the abandoned alignment of the former Louisville and Nashville Railroad Yellow River branch that paralleled 85 between Crestview and Florala, Alabama.

Future
Plans are to expand the section of highway between Auburn and the Alabama state line to four lanes once Alabama completes their State Route 55 expansion to four lanes from south of Andalusia, Alabama to Florala, Alabama. This will provide both a better hurricane evacuation route from Okaloosa County as well as a more direct route to Destin, Florida and Fort Walton Beach, Florida from Interstate 65.

Major intersections

References

External links

Eglin Parkway Resurfacing Project

085
085
085